Shenliu Town is a town and the county seat of Anxiang in Hunan, China. The town was reformed through the amalgamation of Chengguan Town and Anyou Township in September 2008. It took its name after the famous Shenliu Academy built in Qing dynasty and located in the north of the town.

References

External links
 Official Website (Chinese / 中文)

Anxiang County
County seats in Hunan